Edward Bernard Collins (January 30, 1883 – September 2, 1940) was an American actor, comedian and singer. He is best remembered for voicing Dopey in Disney's Snow White and the Seven Dwarfs (1937) and for portraying Tylo in the Shirley Temple film The Blue Bird (1940).

Career
He began working in vaudeville in 1905 and started working in burlesque around 1925. An animator for Walt Disney Productions saw him in a burlesque show and suggested that Disney hire him as a live-action reference model for Dopey in Snow White and the Seven Dwarfs (1937). In the film, Dopey is clumsy and mute, with Happy explaining that he has simply "never tried". In the movie's trailer, Walt Disney describes Dopey as "nice, but sort of silly". In addition to providing Dopey's vocalizations, Collins also recorded sneezing sounds for the film's chipmunk and squirrel characters. After completing his work for the film, Disney wrote a letter to the casting director of 20th Century-Fox and Collins was put under contract to the studio. Collins appeared in twenty-five films.

Next to Dopey, Collins's most-beloved role is that of Tylo, a dog who is magically transformed into a human, in The Blue Bird (1940). Upon being transformed, Tylo follows his mistress Mytyl (Shirley Temple) on a quest to find the famed "Bluebird of happiness". Collins's interpretation of Tylo is that of an easily spooked, but loyal companion who will do anything for those he loves. He died of a heart attack on September 2, 1940, just weeks after the premiere of his last film The Return of Frank James.

Filmography

 Diamond Jim (1935) as Bicycle Act (film debut) (uncredited)
 Married Before Breakfast (1937) as Tramp at Fire (uncredited)
 Ali Baba Goes to Town (1937) as Arab (uncredited)
 Snow White and the Seven Dwarfs (1937) as Dopey (vocal effects and live-action reference only, uncredited)
 In Old Chicago (1937) as Drunk
 Penrod and His Twin Brother (1938) as Captain
 Sally, Irene and Mary (1938) as Ship's Captain
 Kentucky Moonshine (1938) as 'Spats' Swanson
 Alexander's Ragtime Band (1938) as Corporal Collins
 Josette (1938) as Customs Inspector (uncredited)
 Little Miss Broadway (1938) as Band member
 Down on the Farm (1938) as Cyrus Sampson
 Always in Trouble (1938) as Uncle Ed Darlington
 Up the River (1938) as Fisheye Conroy
 Charlie Chan in Honolulu (1939) as Al Hogan
 Young Mr. Lincoln (1939) as Efe Turner
 Charlie Chan in Reno (1939) as The Gabby Cabbie
 News Is Made at Night (1939) as Billiard
 Quick Millions (1939) as Henry 'Beaver' Howard
 Stop, Look and Love (1939) as Dinty
 Hollywood Cavalcade (1939) as Keystone Cop Driver
 Drums Along the Mohawk (1939) as Christian Reall
 Heaven with a Barbed Wire Fence (1939) as Bill
 The Blue Bird (1940) as Tylo
 The Return of Frank James (1940) as Station agent at Eldora (final film role)

References

External links

 
 
 Literature on Eddie Collins
 

1883 births
1940 deaths
American male comedians
American male voice actors
Vaudeville performers
20th-century American male actors
Musicians from Atlantic City, New Jersey
Male actors from New Jersey
20th-century American comedians